Alessandro Messina may refer to:
 Alessandro Messina (cyclist)
 Alessandro Messina (economist)